Boston School can refer to: 

Boston School (painting)
Boston School (music)
Boston Expressionism, a school of painting sometimes referred to as the Boston School
Boston School (photography), a group of young photographers active in the 1970s and 1980s